The Sweet Inspirations are an American R&B girl group mostly known for their work as backup singers on studio recordings for other R&B and rock artists. A founding member of the group was Dionne Warwick, who was later replaced by her aunt, Cissy Houston.

History

The Sweet Inspirations was founded by former members of The Drinkard Singers, a long-running Gospel singing group whose membership included Cissy Houston (née Drinkard), mother of Whitney Houston, and Lee Warwick, who was Cissy's sister and the mother of Sweet Inspirations members Dee Dee and Dionne Warwick.

As a backup group, the Sweet Inspirations was in high demand among producers, publishers, artists, and songwriters in the early 1960s. The original lineup included Doris Troy and the two Warwick sisters Dionne & Dee Dee. Both Troy and Dionne Warwick enjoyed solo careers with hits in 1963, "Just One Look" and "Don't Make Me Over" respectively, on which the Sweet Inspirations can be heard. At that time, Sylvia Shemwell (sister of Judy Clay) replaced Troy, while Cissy Houston took over from Dionne, with Dee Dee Warwick as the group's official leader. The group sang backup for many stars, including Solomon Burke, Aretha Franklin, Wilson Pickett, and Esther Phillips. Dee Dee left in 1965, when her solo career began to take off. She was replaced by Myrna Smith. Estelle Brown joined the team soon after, and the line-up that was to become an Atlantic recording group was set.

In a recording session on March 28, 1967, the Sweet Inspirations provided the backup vocals for Van Morrison on his classic hit "Brown Eyed Girl". It was released in June 1967 and rose to No. 10 on the Billboard Hot 100 charts. In October 2007, Morrison was awarded a Million-Air certificate by BMI for 8 million air plays of  "Brown Eyed Girl".

The Sweet Inspirations recorded by themselves for the first time in April 1967 for Atlantic Records. That session produced the first two singles released by Atlantic, a version of "Why (Am I Treated So Bad)," a song previously recorded by The Staple Singers and a soulful version of "Let It Be Me", a French song which had been a pop and R&B hit for Betty Everett & Jerry Butler in 1964. Though their first singles lacked much chart success, Atlantic was committed to the group, and an August session in Memphis yielded the bulk of songs used for the group's self-titled debut album, released in the late fall of 1967.

Within a month of their chart climb, the group began work on their second album – a gospel record entitled Songs Of Faith & Inspiration. It was released in 1968 under the name "Cissy Drinkard & The Sweet Inspirations."

On March 30, 1968, the group scored their first and only top forty hit on the Billboard Top 40 Pop Chart with the song "Sweet Inspiration" on Atlantic Records. The record was on the chart for ten weeks and peaked at number 18. The group at this point was composed of Houston, Brown, Shemwell, and Smith.

In 1967, the group did backing vocals for the Jimi Hendrix single "Burning of the Midnight Lamp" which was later featured on the album Electric Ladyland in 1968. They also backed Dusty Springfield on her album Dusty in Memphis.

Shortly after cutting the gospel set, the Sweet Inspirations were back in Atlantic's studios to record their third album, What the World Needs Now is Love, recorded in February 1968 in Muscle Shoals, Alabama with the Muscle Shoals Rhythm Section. The late April session produced a version of The Bee Gees' "To Love Somebody", which became the group's fourth R&B chart hit, and a version of The Righteous Brothers' "Unchained Melody," which gave the group a charted, though minor hit.

In 1969, the group recorded their fourth album, Sweets for my Sweet. The Sweet Inspirations also began recording and touring with Elvis Presley as both background singers and his warm-up act, as well as doing occasional live dates with Aretha Franklin.  The association with Presley became well-publicized as he routinely introduced the Sweet Inspirations (along with the TCB Band members, the J. D. Sumner & Stamps Quartet, and Kathy Westmoreland) on his telecast concerts and live recordings. The Sweet Inspirations worked with Presley until his death in 1977.  

Houston's last recording session with The Sweet Inspirations was in October 1969, since she wanted to pursue a solo career and concentrate on her family. The session produced the group's biggest R&B hit in some time. A Gamble & Huff composition, "Gotta Find Me A Brand New Lover" appeared on the group's fifth album Sweet Sweet Soul.

The remainder of the album was recorded in November 1970, with Shemwell, Brown, Smith, and new member Ann Williams, a friend of Brown's who stayed for what turned out to be the group's last full Atlantic album. Also included from that set are "That’s The Way My Baby Is", and "Flash In The Pan". A final Atlantic session in June 1970 brought the group (now a trio with Brown, Smith, and Shemwell) its last  two singles for the label; "This World" (from the musical The Me Nobody Knows), and "Evidence".

In 1973, Brown, Smith, and Shemwell recorded an album for Stax Records. By 1979, Estelle Brown had quit the group and was replaced by Gloria Brown, who toured with them but did not sing on the Sweet Inspirations’ last LP, Hot Butterfly, on RSO Records, with singer Pat Terry featured on the actual recording. They group broke up shortly thereafter. In 1978, the group sang backing vocals on Frankie Valli's No.1 hit "Grease" from the film of the same name. In 1979, the group toured with The Bee Gees during their U.S. Spirits Having Flown Tour singing backup.

The Sweet Inspirations (Estelle Brown, Smith, and Shemwell) got back together again in 1994, with new member Portia Griffin. They performed at Elvis Presley tribute shows, and released new material in 2005. Shemwell suffered a stroke in 2001 that has kept her from performing with the group. They also recorded choir backing for The Killers' 2004 recording, Hot Fuss, on songs "Andy, You're a Star" and "All These Things That I've Done". Shemwell died on February 13, 2010.

In March 2010, while on a European tour for Elvis: The Concert, Smith developed pneumonia. Once back in the U.S., her condition continued to deteriorate, as she suffered kidney failure, further complicated by a severe stroke. By October 2010, she was a patient at the Canyon Oaks Nursing & Rehabilitation Center in Canoga Park, California. She died on December 24, 2010.

Members
 Dionne Warwick – soprano (1960–1963)
 Dee Dee Warwick – mezzo-soprano (1960–1965; died 2008)
 Doris Troy – contralto (1960–1963; died 2004)
 Cissy Houston – soprano/1st soprano (1963–1969)
 Sylvia Shemwell – mezzo-soprano/2nd soprano (1966?–1979, 1994–2001; died 2010)
 Estelle Brown – contralto/2nd alto (1965–1979, 1994—present)
 Myrna Smith – contralto/1st alto (1965–1979, 1994–2010; died 2010)
 Ann Williams – soprano/1st soprano (1969–1970)
 Gloria Brown – contralto (1979)
 Portia Griffin – soprano (1994–present)
 Kelly Jones – mezzo soprano/soprano (2010–present)

Discography

Albums
1967: The Sweet Inspirations (Atlantic)
1968: Songs of Faith & Inspiration (Atlantic)
1968: What the World Needs Now is Love (Atlantic)
1969: Sweets for My Sweet (Atlantic)
1970: Sweet Sweet Soul (Atlantic)
1973: Estelle, Myrna and Sylvia (Stax)
1974; Wanted Dead or Alive(Columbia)
1979: Hot Butterfly (RSO)
2005: In the Right Place (Frixion)

With Yusef Lateef
1968: The Blue Yusef Lateef (Atlantic)
1970: Suite 16 (Atlantic)
1970: The Diverse Yusef Lateef (Atlantic)
1971: The Gentle Giant (Atlantic)

Backing vocals
1967: Blowin' Your Mind!; Van Morrison
1967: Aretha Arrives; Aretha Franklin
1968: Lady Soul; Aretha Franklin
1968: Aretha Now; Aretha Franklin
1968: Electric Ladyland; The Jimi Hendrix Experience
1968: Goodies; George Benson
1969: Hey Jude; Wilson Pickett
1969: Elvis in Person at the International Hotel; Elvis Presley
1969: Dusty in Memphis; Dusty Springfield
1969: Do Your Own Thing; Brook Benton
1970: Turning Around; Dee Dee Warwick
1970: This Girl's in Love with You; Aretha Franklin
1970: That's the Way It Is; Elvis Presley
1970: Spirit in the Dark; Aretha Franklin
1970: Just a Little Lovin'''; Carmen McRae
1971: Warm and Tender; Petula Clark
1971: Search and Nearness; The Rascals
1971: Thirds; James Gang
1972: As Recorded at Madison Square Garden; Elvis Presley
1972: Young, Gifted and Black Aretha Franklin
1973: Aloha From Hawaii: Via Satellite; Elvis Presley
1973: The Weapon; David Newman
1974: T.B. Sheets; Van Morrison
1974: Elvis Recorded Live on Stage in Memphis; Elvis Presley
1977: Elvis in Concert; Elvis Presley
1979: Reddy; Helen Reddy
1998: Undiscovered Soul; Richie Sambora
2004: Hot Fuss; The Killers
2006: Elvis Lives: The 25th Anniversary Concert'' (DVD)

Charts

Albums

U.S. chart singles

References

External links
Sweet Inspirations Bio Page
Exclusive Interview with Myrna Smith
Interview with Myrna Smith
Myrna Smith Interview at Elvis2001.net

American gospel musical groups
American soul musical groups
American Christian musical groups
RSO Records artists
African-American girl groups
Stax Records artists
Musical groups established in the 1950s
Elvis Presley